ANT1 Pacific (pronounced Antenna) is a subscription TV channel established in 1998. The channel is partly owned by ANT1 Greece. It is a general entertainment channel screening international, Greek and some locally produced programs.

External links

ANT1 Group
Greek-language television stations
Television channels and stations established in 1998
1998 establishments in Greece